Fitzy may refer to:
 Ryan Fitzgerald, former Big Brother Australia contestant and professional Australian football player
 John "Honey Fitz" Fitzgerald, late politician
 Daniel Fitzgerald (Neighbours), fictional character from the Australian soap opera Neighbours
 Fitzy Fitzgerald, mayor of Dog River in Canadian sitcom Corner Gas, played by Cavan Cunningham
 Constable Lara Fitzgerald, fictional character in Australian soap opera Home and Away
 Simon Fitzgerald (Home and Away),  fictional character in Australian soap opera Home and Away
 Fitzpatrick Stadium, a 6,000 seat multi-purpose outdoor stadium in Portland, Maine
 John Fitzgerald (soccer), Canadian soccer player & businessman